A Ministry of Defence or Defense (see spelling differences), also known as a Department of Defence or Defense, is the common name for a part of the government found in states where the government is divided into ministries or departments, responsible for matters of defence. The title Defence Minister, Minister for Defence, Secretary of Defense, Secretary of State for Defence, Secretary of National Defense or some other titles, is assigned to the person in a cabinet position in charge of this particular ministry, which regulates the armed forces in sovereign states. The role of Minister of Defence serves an integral part in a country's military purposes. This role has traditionally been given to men because of the gender-biased nature of the military office. However, recent years have seen the appointment of female Defence Ministers. The following list shows group of women that are/were entitled with the title of Minister of Defence in charge in regulating the armed forces in their respective countries. The first woman ever entitled to this job was the then-Prime Minister of Ceylon, Sirimavo Bandaranaike, back in 1960s.

List

Italics denotes an acting defence minister and minister of non-sovereign state

Notes

See also
List of current defence ministers
Defence diplomacy

References

External links
Female Defence Ministers
Rulers.org List of rulers throughout time and places
Female Defense Ministers from Georgia and Norway discuss NATO, gender, civil society: interview for Caucasian Journal (2021)

female
list
Defence
Defence ministers